Felimare porterae is a species of sea slug, a dorid nudibranch, a shell-less marine gastropod mollusk in the family Chromodorididae. It was named by Theodore Dru Alison Cockerell in honor of his wife Wilmatte Porter Cockerell.

Distribution
This species was described from rockpools at La Jolla, California. It is reported from Monterey Bay, California to Bahía Tortugas, Baja California, Mexico.

Description
Felimare porterae has a dark blue mantle with a white margin and bright yellow bands which run down the sides of the mantle from the bases of the rhinophores to the gill pocket. There is a light blue line along the middle of the back.

References

Chromodorididae
Gastropods described in 1901